Lieutenant General Hennie Kotze  (born 1919) 
was a former South African Army officer, who served as Chief of Staff Logistics from 1975 to 1978.

Army career 
He joined the Union Defence Force in 1938. He saw action during the Second World War and the Korean War. Chief of Support Services in 1969. Quartermaster General SADF in 1974 and last served  as Chief of Staff Logistics. He retired from the SADF with pension in 1979.

Awards and decorations

References

South African generals
1919 births
Possibly living people
South African military personnel of World War II
South African military personnel of the Korean War